The Churton Memorial Fountain stands on the west side of Brownlow Street, Whitchurch, Shropshire, England.  It is recorded in the National Heritage List for England as a designated Grade II listed building.

History

The fountain was built in 1882 by John Churton as a memorial to his parents and wife, and was designed by the Chester architect John Douglas.  It was originally situated at the junctions of Brownlow Street, Green End, Talbot Street and Station Road.  In the early 1930s it was moved to its present position further along Brownlow Street because it was interfering with traffic flow.

Architecture

The memorial takes the form of a drinking fountain.  On the front and back are copper spouts in the form of lions' heads, and at the sides are semicircular animal drinking troughs.  It is constructed in stone and has an octagonal plan; it is in Gothic Revival style.  The base is in granite with alternating pink and grey bands, while the upper parts are in sandstone ashlar with red and grey bands.  At the front and back, above the spouts, are panels flanked by buttresses, surmounted by crocketted gables and finials.  On each side are disused gas mantles.  At the top is an octagonal pinnacle over which is a crocketted spire with a wrought iron cross finial.  The memorial includes two inscriptions: one refers to the donor, while the other is taken from St John's Gospel.

See also
Listed buildings in Whitchurch Urban
List of non-ecclesiastical and non-residential works by John Douglas

References

Grade II listed buildings in Shropshire
John Douglas buildings
Infrastructure completed in 1882
Gothic Revival architecture in Shropshire
Monuments and memorials in Shropshire
Whitchurch, Shropshire